The 8 cm kanon vz. 30 (Cannon model 30) was a Czech field gun used in World War II. Guns captured after the German invasion of Czechoslovakia in March 1939 were taken into Wehrmacht service as the 8 cm FK 30(t). It was used by a variety of German units during World War II, including I./SS-Artillerie-Abteilung 3 between 1939 and 1940.

Design & history
The origins of the 8 cm kanon vz. 30 began in 1930 at the Škoda Works in Pilsen.  It was modified from an earlier Skoda design, the 8 cm kanon vz. 28, which attempted to combine the field, mountain and anti-aircraft roles into one weapon. It proved to be fairly successful at the first two, but was a failure at the third.  The Czechs only used the vz. 28 in limited numbers, but exported versions of the gun to Yugoslavia and Romania.  The Czechs decided to adopt the vz. 30 to replace their plethora of aged Austro-Hungarian field guns. They deleted the firing platform of the original design and used standard Czech 76.5 mm ammunition. It shared the same carriage that could break down into three pieces for transport a feature also shared by the earlier 10 cm houfnice vz. 28 and the later 10 cm houfnice vz. 30 guns.

References
 Engelmann, Joachim and Scheibert, Horst. Deutsche Artillerie 1934-1945: Eine Dokumentation in Text, Skizzen und Bildern: Ausrüstung, Gliederung, Ausbildung, Führung, Einsatz. Limburg/Lahn, Germany: C. A. Starke, 1974
 Gander, Terry and Chamberlain, Peter. Weapons of the Third Reich: An Encyclopedic Survey of All Small Arms, Artillery and Special Weapons of the German Land Forces 1939-1945. New York: Doubleday, 1979 
 Peter Chamberlain and Terry Gander: Light and Medium field Artillery. New York. Arco Publishing. 1977.

Notes

External links
 page on the two Czech vz. 30 weapons

World War II artillery of Germany
World War II field artillery
Artillery of Czechoslovakia
76 mm artillery
Military equipment introduced in the 1930s